Renfrew Glacier is in the U.S. state of Oregon. The glacier is situated in the Cascade Range at an elevation generally above . Renfrew Glacier is on the northwest slopes of Middle Sister, an extinct stratovolcano.

See also
 List of glaciers in the United States

References

Glaciers of Oregon
Glaciers of Lane County, Oregon